Tom Mitchell (born 10 May 1958 in Taveuni) is a Fijian former rugby union footballer, who played as wing or centre.

Career
At club level, he played for the Fiji Army rugby union team.
His first cap for Fiji was during a match against Tonga, at Nuku'alofa, on 28 June 1986. He was also part of the 1987 Rugby World Cup squad, where he played two matches, in the pool match against Italy and in the quarter-final lost against France. His last international cap was against Tonga, at Nadi, on 8 October 1988.

Notes

External links
 Tom Mitchell international stats

1958 births
Fijian rugby union players
Rugby union centres
Rugby union wings
Living people
People from Taveuni
I-Taukei Fijian people
Fiji international rugby union players